In basketball, a rebound is the act of gaining possession of the ball after a missed field goal or free throw. The Dutch Basketball League's (DBL) rebounding title is awarded to the player with the highest rebounds per game average in a given regular season. The rebounding title was first recognized in the 1985–1986 season when statistics on rebounds were first compiled.

Leaders

References

rebounds